Poteet High School may refer to:
 Poteet High School (Texas), a high school in Poteet, Texas
 Poteet High School (Mesquite, Texas)